The Videos is the first compilation DVD by Brandy. It features all her videos from 1994 to 1999 (only "Missing You" and the remix video for "U Don't Know Me" aren't included). It was released on VHS in 1999 in the U.S., and re-issued in 2000 as a DVD; in Germany, the DVD was released in 2005.

Track listing 
Baby
Brokenhearted (Soulpower Mix feat. Wanya Morris)
I Wanna Be Down
Have You Ever?
Sittin' Up in My Room
Best Friend
The Boy Is Mine (Duet with Monica)
Almost Doesn't Count
Top of the World (feat. Ma$e)
I Wanna Be Down (Remix feat. Queen Latifah, Yo-Yo, and MC Lyte)
U Don't Know Me (Like U Used To)

The videos

References

Brandy Norwood video albums
2000 video albums